David Henry Saunders-Davies (1894 – 12 August 1975) was the second Bishop of Stockport from 1951 until 1965.

Educated at Liverpool College and Queens' College, Cambridge, he held Curacies at St John, Birkenhead and St John, Reading and incumbencies at Hollingworth and Mobberley before wartime service with the RAFVR. When peace returned he was appointed Rural Dean and then Suffragan Bishop of Stockport. He was consecrated a bishop by Cyril Garbett, Archbishop of York, on 2 February 1951 at York Minster. After retiring, he was an Assistant Bishop within the Diocese of Worcester

References

1894 births
People educated at Liverpool College
Alumni of Queens' College, Cambridge
20th-century Church of England bishops
Royal Air Force Volunteer Reserve personnel of World War II
Bishops of Stockport
1975 deaths